Mar Aphrem Church, in Vadavathoor, Kottayam, India, is the first church in Kerala in the name of St. Ephrem of Syria. St. Mary and St. George are the other two saints of this church.

External links
 Website of the Mar Aphrem Church, Vadavathoor
 Sketch of proposed new church
 St. Ephraem "Faith Adoring the Mystery"

Churches in Kottayam district